Peacocke is a surname, and may refer to:

 Anthony Peacocke, British police officer
 Arthur Peacocke (1924–2006), English Anglican theologian and biochemist
 Christopher Peacocke (born 1950), British philosopher
 Cuthbert Peacocke (1903–1994), Church of Ireland cleric
 Gemma Peacocke, composer from New Zealand
 Gerry Peacocke (1931–2013), Australian politician 
 Isabel Peacocke (1881–1973), New Zealand teacher, novelist and broadcaster
 Joseph Peacocke (archbishop of Dublin) (1835–1916), Church of Ireland cleric
 Joseph Peacocke (bishop of Derry and Raphoe) (1866–1962), Church of Ireland cleric
 Joseph Peacocke (cricketer) (1904–1961), Irish first-class cricketer
 M. R. Peacocke (born 1930), English poet
 Ponsonby Peacocke (1813–1872), British officer of the Bombay Army and artist
 Pryce Peacocke, Anglican priest in Ireland 
 Steve Peacocke (born 1981), Australian actor
 Thomas Peacocke, Canadian actor
 T. W. Peacocke (born 1960), Canadian television and film director

See also
 Peacocke, New Zealand, a suburb of Hamilton
 Peacock (disambiguation)